Nafiz is a male Turkish given name. People named Nafiz include:

 Faruk Nafiz Çamlıbel (1898–1973), Turkish poet, author and later politician
 Faruk Nafız Özak (born 1946), Public Works and Housing Minister of Turkey

Turkish masculine given names